Baba Nation was a Norwegian soul/funk band, founded in the city of Bergen by Jan Erik de Lange Gullaksen in 1990, then by the name Yee ’Ha Wanna Have A Baba.

Their biggest hit, "Too Bad", had a 17-week hit list run. Other popular singles include "Ragamuffinmini" and the ballad "Time to Heal".

Discography

Albums
Do This'''' (1994) as Yee ’Ha Wanna Have A BabaLove Express (1996)«B»'' (1998)

Singles
"Too bad" (1999)

Members
Erik Røe, vocals
Jan Erik de Lange Gullaksen, guitar
Knut Hillersøy, keyboard
Nicolai Hauan, bass
Tore Christian Sævold, drums (pre 1995)
Tor Bjarne Bjelland, drums (1995)
Ingolf Torgersen, drums (1995)
Morten Skaug, drums (1995-)

Norwegian soul musical groups
Norwegian funk musical groups
Musical groups established in 1990
1990 establishments in Norway
Musical groups from Bergen